Thomas Gabriel Fischer (born 19 July 1963), also known by the stage names Tom Warrior and Satanic Slaughter, is a Swiss musician. He led the extreme metal groups Hellhammer and Celtic Frost, and today is the frontman of the band Triptykon.

Career
Fischer (as "Tom Warrior"), along with Urs Sprenger (as "Steve Warrior") on bass and Pete Stratton (real name Peter Ebneter) on drums, formed the metal band Hammerhead in early 1982. Stratton was soon replaced by Bruce "Denial Fiend" Day (real name Jörg Neubart) and the band changed its name to Hellhammer the same year. In late 1983, bassist and songwriter Martin Eric Ain joined Hellhammer and the lineup of Fischer, Ain and Day recorded an EP, Apocalyptic Raids, as well as a series of demos for the German label Noise Records before disbanding in May 1984. Fischer and Ain joined forces once again and formed Celtic Frost, an influential avant-garde and extreme metal trio, in June 1984.

In 1985, Fischer was asked to co-produce and sing on the first demo, titled Death Cult, by fellow Swiss group Coroner. Fischer also wrote the lyrics for the recorded songs. Two of the members of Coroner formed part of Celtic Frost's road crew until 1986. In 1987, many conflicts within Celtic Frost led to a dissolution of the band. 

Several months later, Fischer reformed the band with a completely new lineup. The band's 1988 release, Cold Lake, established a drastic change in Celtic Frost's music, but greatly disappointed most fans. Fischer has stated many times that he takes the blame for the negative direction of Celtic Frost's music during this period, since he was too distracted with a personal relationship and let the other band members do what they wanted. Celtic Frost eventually disbanded in 1993.

A year after Celtic Frost was laid to rest, Fischer formed the EBM/industrial rock project Apollyon Sun.

In 2000, Fischer's book Are You Morbid?: Into the Pandemonium of Celtic Frost received many favorable reviews, including this from Record Collector: "Intelligent, humble, questioning, insightful – the cultured side of extreme metal".

Sometime in 2001, Fischer and Martin Eric Ain met each other again and began writing music, with the aim of creating a new, dark and heavy Celtic Frost album in the vein of their work on To Mega Therion and Into the Pandemonium. The album, titled Monotheist, was eventually released in 2006.

Fischer also performed in Probot, Dave Grohl's collaborative project with various metal artists, on the song "Big Sky" in 2003.

In 2005, Fischer produced vocal (performed by Martin Eric Ain) and guitar tracks (Erol Uenala) for a "gothicized" version of Slayer's classic "Black Magic" recorded by Los Angeles-based gothic rock band Hatesex. The track appeared on their debut album Unwant. 

Due to the internal conflict within Celtic Frost, Fischer left the band on 2 April 2008 and launched a new band named Triptykon.

In 2008, he played guitars and bass for the cover song "Set the Controls for the Heart of the Sun" from the 1349 (a Norwegian black metal band) album Revelations of the Black Flame and also co-mixed the album. In 2009, he co-produced their album Demonoir. 

In 2010, Fischer was awarded in the Metal Hammer Golden Gods Awards for Inspiration. Fischer was ranked No. 32 out of 100 Greatest Heavy Metal Guitarists of All Time by Guitar World.

He currently plays an Ibanez H. R. Giger series Iceman guitar. He also uses an Ibanez Tube Screamer overdrive pedal. 

Fischer is a vegan. He also states that he does not drink, smoke, or take drugs.

Fischer was the personal assistant to H. R. Giger from 2007 until Giger's death. He was a close friend of Giger and his wife Carmen, and continues to be active for the Giger estate, in the Fondation H.R. Giger, and as the co-director of the Museum HR Giger.

Discography

Hellhammer
 Death Fiend (demo, 1983)
 Triumph of Death (demo, 1983)
 Satanic Rites (demo, 1983)
 Apocalyptic Raids (EP, 1984)
 Apocalyptic Raids 1990 A.D. (compilation, 1990)
 Demon Entrails (compilation, 2008)
 Blood Insanity (single, 2016)

Celtic Frost
 Morbid Tales (mini album/album, 1984)
 Emperor's Return (EP, 1985)
 To Mega Therion (album, 1985)
 Tragic Serenades (EP, 1986)
 Into the Pandemonium (album, 1987)
 I Won't Dance (EP, 1987)
 Cold Lake (album, 1988)
 Vanity/Nemesis (album, 1990)
 Wine in My Hand (EP, 1990)
 Parched with Thirst Am I and Dying (compilation, 1992)
 Monotheist (album, 2006)
 Innocence and Wrath (compilation, 2017)

Coroner
 Death Cult (demo, 1986)

Apollyon Sun
 God Leaves (EP, 1998)
 Sub (album, 2000)

Probot
 Probot (album, 2004)

Dark Fortress
 Eidolon (album, 2008)

1349
 Revelations of the Black Flame (album, 2009)

Triptykon
 Eparistera Daimones (album, 2010)
 Shatter (EP, 2010)
 Breathing (single, 2014)
 Melana Chasmata (album, 2014)
 Requiem - Live at Roadburn 2019 (album, 2020)

Bibliography

References

External links

 Official Celtic Frost website
 Delineation – Tom Gabriel Fischer's blog

1963 births
Living people
Black metal guitarists
Black metal singers
Death metal musicians
Swiss male singers
Swiss guitarists
Swiss heavy metal musicians
Celtic Frost members